1984 Shakin'  was a various artists "hits" collection album released in Australia in 1984 on the Festival record Label (Cat No. RML 50005). The album spent two weeks at the top of the Australian album charts in 1984.

Track listing

Charts

References

1984 compilation albums
Pop compilation albums
Festival Records compilation albums